Fernando Pascale (born 18 August 1976) is a retired Dutch football defender.

References

1976 births
Living people
Dutch footballers
Excelsior Rotterdam players
Feyenoord players
FC Volendam players
FC Dordrecht players
Association football defenders
Eredivisie players
Eerste Divisie players